Schweppes Australia is the non-alcohol business of Asahi Breweries operating in Australia. It is now known as Asahi Lifestyle Beverage having originally arrived in the country in 1850. In 1877, the first factory was built in Sydney. After an international merger with Cadbury in 1969, forming Cadbury Schweppes, the company was eventually re-separated on 27 February 2009 and, in April 2009, Schweppes Australia was acquired by Asahi Breweries.

Schweppes was first sold in Australia in 1850. It began local production when it opened a factory in Sydney in 1877, followed by one in Melbourne in 1885.

Schweppes Australia is a licensed manufacturer and distributor of brands such as Pepsi, Sunkist, Mountain Dew, and Gatorade. They also produce Schweppes range of soft drinks, as well as many other Australian brands, including Solo, Passiona, Cottee’s Cordial, Spring Valley Beverages, Pop Tops and Cool Ridge, and Frantelle spring water. In 2011, Asahi acquired the juice and water brands of P&N Beverages, Australia's third largest volume supplier of  fruit juices, soft drinks and mineral waters.

The Asahi Beverages head office is located in Melbourne. There are eight manufacturing sites across five states and sales offices in each state.

Products 
Classic Mixers: Dry Ginger Ale, Diet Dry Ginger Ale, Indian Tonic Water, Lemon, Lime & Bitters, Soda Water, Diet Tonic Water, Bitter Lemon

Agrum Collection: Blood Orange (originally called Ciata), Citrus Blend (originally simply called Agrum), Sugar Free Citrus Blend, White Grape & Passionfruit (discontinued circa 2014), Calamansi Lime (Viage; discontinued circa 2006)

Mineral Waters: Lemon, Orange & Lime, Orange & Mango, Sparking Mineral Water, Apple & Pink Grapefruit, Lemon & Lime, Orange & Passionfruit, Natural Mineral Water

Traditional Soft Drinks: Red Cream Soda, Brown Cream Soda, Raspberry, Sarsaparilla, Pink Lemonade, Lime, Ginger Beer, Fruit Tingler, and Fairy Floss

Cordials: Raspberry Cordial, Lemon Cordial, Lime Cordial [2]

See also

List of oldest companies in Australia

References

External links

Asahi Breweries
Australian subsidiaries of foreign companies
Drink companies of Australia
Food and drink companies based in Melbourne
Food and drink companies established in 1877
Fruit sodas
Lemon sodas
Australian companies established in 1877
PepsiCo bottlers
Soft drinks manufacturers
Manufacturing companies based in Melbourne